Virtual dance is a 21st-century artform in the metaverse. It is a variant of performing arts created by use of digital technologies that make avatars move and dance in virtual worlds, such as Second Life or other virtual communities.

Virtual dance in Second Life

History
Virtual dance in Second Life came alive around 2009 with a few avatars grouping to explore the posibilities of virtual burlesque. Over the years another SL group, Dance Queens, developed to a community of well over thousand members with lots of dance events scheduled every week and especially during the weekends.

Avatars animations and streaming music 
Dancing to music in virtual dance clubs is one of the oldest forms of entertainment in Second Life. 

To create a choreography in a virtual world like Second Life one needs user account and choose an avatar. This avatar can pose and move by sets of character animations. Sets of default character animations are available to each avatar. 

In addition, bvh-animations can be created manually in apps like Poser and Blender or by means of motion capture. Most of these can override the built-in standard animations, due to a higher animation priority. In this way an avatar can use individualized sets of animations (standing, walking, running, swimming, flying etc.) to express certain characters or styles.

Special user created dance animations can move avatars as if they where dancing and are available in various stores within the virtual worlds. In SL a dance animation can have a duration of up to 60 seconds(2023). Regular dance animations are always looped animations. Different series of dances can be sequenced by putting them into HUDs that can also record and play macro's along a timeline of a longer duration. Virtual dancers can simulate all kinds of dances known in real life like waltz, tango, salsa, funk, bebop hip hop and even classical ballet routines like Swan Lake.

Simple dance HUDs are scripted items to allow residents to choose dance animations to dance alone or with friends. Advanced tools offer directors ways to set up posers that follow a specified route during playback of the timeline. These tools are suitable for more complex choreographies where dancers seem to move down stairways and back and forth to various locations on stage. Special effects can include the use of spotlights, projections and the use of the particle system to create colorful explosions to enhance the acts visually.

Virtual worlds offer dancers far more flexibility than the real, physical world. Avatars in virtual worlds can fly, hover, swim, jump and defy gravity in various ways. So there are possibilities to create dances in the air, flying or under water, swimming. Through shapeshifting they can quickly change to a complety different appearance and for example shift their looks from a monster to a prince and back again. Virtual dance also offers enhanced possibilities to people with disabilities.

Synchronization of dancers in a group has a special easthetic appeal. This effect can be easily reached by all dancers being animated by the same HUD, 

Another way to do it is by individual dancers on their own improvisation. There are two schools of thought about this but the majority of dance troupes use tools made by advanced scripters to record and program their moves in advance. 

The addition of new bones to the bento skeleton improved facial expression and animating of bodyparts like fingers, tails and ears. The arrival of 'animesh' in SL made it possible to script and animate SL objects such as animals and mannequins. This way some of the backup dancers can be inanimate mesh figures that don't need to be 'populated' by real humans behind a computer anymore. This offers also a practical solution for choreographers preparing their act while being alone in their studio.

Subgenres of virtual dance are for example burlesque and cabaret, gorean dance, fantasy settings (mermaids, elves), experimental forms of modern dance, latin and couple dance and elaborate group shows of up to 18 dancers on stage at the same time.

Music in virtual worlds is streamed to the land parcel where it is to be heard. All avatars on a parcel can hear this stream by enabling music in their audio settings. Venues can have a continuous stream provided by internet radio, but for dance shows a live stream is used to play a certain song at a certain time. The dance leader will be in close touch with the DJ to have the choreography start virtually at the same time as the music. Both are aware of the latency of a few seconds due to the audio being streamed over a more or less slow network. 

Streaming of live-music by musicians from their home studio to venues is populair entertainment in clubs. Here the audience can often join a dance leader on their dance hud or a stand alone dance engine that automates the synchronicity of all group dancers. Live music is hardly used at choreographed dance shows but live musicians like to stay in character while performing as a singer and guitar player on a virtual stage.

Theaters, companies and dance clubs 
In 2023 there is a steady list of approximately 30 theatres and dance companies in Second Life that perform dance shows weekly, monthly or come up with a large production every few months. 

Dance venues can handle audiences of approximately 80 avatars at a time. Some have the maximum at 40 visitors. In an advanced configuration of a theatre centered on four regions the maximum would be around 360 avatars at a time. This setup is rare but can sometimes be seen at large events like the yearly Second Life Birthday (SLB) or Burning Life (Burn2).

The diversity of acts ranges from a solo- and groupdances on a single stage to large, regionwide productions taking the audience to several diferent stages. In this case the audience will be seated on a moving vehicle, like a bleacher under an aircraft or in a bus or a ship.

Gorean dance is traditionally performed in a round dance pit, 'the sands'. The idea of a round stage with seatings all around like a circus was adapted by a few other groups like Terpsicorps Artwerks and Guerilla Burlesque.

a selection of companies by name 
 Ballet Pixelle produces experimental immersive theatre
 Club Image is a Japanese venue doing shows on sundays twice a month
 Debauche is a large group of female dancers doing a busy schedule of state of the art shows
 Elysium Cabaret at the Empire Room is a collective of dancers performing their acts in weekly shows. 
 Guerilla Burlesque at Idle Rogue does various nightlife events and shows like the yearly Cirque de Nuit
 The Monarchs do large spectacle productions in their own full region. The group of followers has over 2000 members.

Shows, sets and HUD's - training, fame and revenues
Most staged shows have a duration of approximately sixty minutes and do consist of several routines. In between acts the sets are changed by deleting the previous one and rezzing the next one from a rezzing box, or by dragging them in place from a location over or under the stage. 

Some shows offer the visitors a scripted seating or a special HUD that takes over their camera controls in order to provide them with the best possible viewing angles. Sometimes HUD's are given out that show translations of spoken text. The dancers often need to change their costumes in between two sets. They can also be changed on stage during the act. 

Visiting a dance show in real time can be an truly immersive experience. The excitement of the interactive aspect, like greeting each other, chatting, joking and applauding, can not completey be transported in snapshots that visitors make and publish on Flickr. Some visitors create machinima of the dance events and publish these on Youtube. Taking images is sometimes actively encouraged by the master of ceremonies and asked to be shared on the Flickr or facebook pages of the dance troupes. 

Aspiring dancers are trained by the leaders and teachers of the companies or visit dance classes provided by academies like Journey Academy of Performing Arts (JAPA), Dancing Outside the Lines (DOL) or Dance Queens Boot Camp. Experienced dancers do supply classes on use of advanced tools and techniques. These are available inworld at the shops of supliers like Spot On
and Metaharpers Show Tools. Also availabe on Second Life Marketplace. An advanced hud was made available for free and open source by Fleursoft (Fleur Cooperstone). This hud is also available in the virtual world community Kitely.

An inworld magazine in SL devoted to showcase different aspects of virtual dance was Move magazine, a quarterly which saw its first issue published in June 2015. This magazine was available inworld for free and saw three editions on issuu.

A website with announcements, retrospects of past shows and a calendar of upcoming shows is made available by the SL group 'Dance Queens'. 

Dancers in Second Life are only known to the audience by their avatar names. Some will share their location or timezone. Although they may have a group of dedicted followers, their 'fame' will by nature of the medium be very limited. 

Admission to dance shows is usually free of charge. Dancers, clubs, dj's and hosts may put up tipjars to collect donations in Linden dollars. Revenues in most cases just cover a very small part of the costs of production and facilities. Sometimes benefit shows will raise certain sums for support of institutions like Relay for Life.

Gallery

Other forms of virtual dance 
Other forms of virtual dance may be executed live by professional dancers while interacting with an avatar that is being projected on a large screen. Also the use of a virtual reality headset can make it possible for a real dancer to dance with a virtual partner, as offered by some online dance classes.

The expression 'virtual dance' appears in a number of texts dated long before the digital age. 

The idea of artificial dance can be traced back to centuries ago as puppeteers and marionettists already made their puppets and marionettes dance in graceful ways. An early text about this artform was published in 1810 by Heinrich von Kleist in his essay Über das Marionettentheater, which was translated in english.

Further reading

References 

Dance animation
Performing arts
Puppetry‎
Second Life
Virtual world communities